Lachnophorus is a genus of beetles in the family Carabidae, containing the following species:

 Lachnophorus aeneicollis Bates, 1871 
 Lachnophorus angusticollis Putzeys, 1878 
 Lachnophorus axillaris Motschulsky, 1864 
 Lachnophorus azureus Liebke, 1936 
 Lachnophorus bipunctatus Gory, 1833 
 Lachnophorus corrosus Bates, 1883 
 Lachnophorus cuprellus Bates, 1891 
 Lachnophorus cyanescens Putzeys, 1878 
 Lachnophorus elegantulus Mannerheim, 1843 
 Lachnophorus femoralis Motschulsky, 1864 
 Lachnophorus foveatus Bates, 1871 
 Lachnophorus gibbosus Liebke, 1936 
 Lachnophorus guttulatus Bates, 1883 
 Lachnophorus impressus Brulle, 1837 
 Lachnophorus integer Liebke, 1936 
 Lachnophorus laetus Bates, 1871 
 Lachnophorus leucopterus Chevrolat, 1863 
 Lachnophorus longulus Bates, 1878 
 Lachnophorus macrospilus Bates, 1871 
 Lachnophorus maculatus Chaudoir, 1850 
 Lachnophorus marginatus Liebke, 1936 
 Lachnophorus montoroi Tremoleras, 1931 
 Lachnophorus nevermanni Liebke, 1939 
 Lachnophorus notatus Chaudoir, 1850 
 Lachnophorus ochropus Bates, 1871 
 Lachnophorus ornatus Bates, 1871 
 Lachnophorus pallidipennis Putzeys, 1846 
 Lachnophorus pallipes Reiche, 1843 
 Lachnophorus pictipennis Bates, 1871 
 Lachnophorus pilosus Dejean, 1831 
 Lachnophorus quadrinotatus Bates, 1871 
 Lachnophorus quadrinus Bates, 1871 
 Lachnophorus rugosus Dejean, 1831 
 Lachnophorus sabanillae Liebke, 1936 
 Lachnophorus signatipennis Chaudoir, 1850 
 Lachnophorus steinbachi Liebke, 1936 
 Lachnophorus submaculatus Bates, 1871 
 Lachnophorus tessellatus (Motschulsky, 1855) 
 Lachnophorus tibialis Bates, 1871

References

Lebiinae